Mighty Garvey! is the fifth and final studio album by Manfred Mann, released on 28 June 1968 by Fontana Records. It was the last recorded by the band (not including compilations) after the change of direction and personnel of their 1966 album As Is. It continued a transition away from jazz and blues towards self-composed art-pop. Despite including two UK top 5 hit singles (Bob Dylan's "Mighty Quinn" and Tony Hazzard's "Ha! Ha! Said the Clown"), the album did not chart and the band split up the year after. In the US and Canada, it was released as The Mighty Quinn by Mercury Records.

Overview
The group's continued pop success with material by established songwriters such as Dylan and Hazzard made its handlers averse to the risk of releasing self-written singles, a state of affairs that had prevailed ever since the success of "Do Wah Diddy Diddy", even though the group's first hits had been self-composed. At least one example of drummer Mike Hugg's new-found productivity had been seen as potentially chart-worthy and singer Mike d'Abo was able to provide other artists with hits such as "Build Me Up Buttercup" and "Handbags and Gladrags". The resultant pop image did not encourage album sales to "serious" listeners, particularly when trends were turning from baroque pop to hard rock. So, like contemporary releases by The Kinks and The Zombies, Mighty Garvey! became a record esteemed more in retrospect than at the time. It was later re-issued in 2003, with bonus tracks.

The group's commercial compromises also led to "self-knocking", and its recordings developed an ironic distance that on Mighty Garvey sometimes invites comparison with The Kinks, Dave Dee, Dozy, Beaky, Mick & Tich, Frank Zappa or The Bonzo Dog Band. Even on Hugg's intricate and sentimental "Harry the One Man Band" the vocal track finally dissolves into schoolboy mirth and silly noises. The three different versions of d'Abo's song "Happy Families", credited as; (Track 1) Performed by Eddie 'Fingers' Garvey, (Track 6) Performed by Ed Garvey and The Trio and (Track 14) Performed by Edwin O'Garvey and His Showband, are outright parodies of "the pompous big rock band style, the sleazy lounge jazz style, and then the semi-drunk family entertainment "country-shape Christmas" style" that appropriate and poke fun at the Sgt. Pepper's Lonely Hearts Club Band concept ("Edwin Garvey" being an invented character introduced on the similarly flippant flip side of "Mighty Quinn").

These three parodies and two hit singles take up over a third of a relatively short L.P. and of the remainder, d'Abo's "Country Dancing" and "The Vicar's Daughter" are likewise somewhat arch, besides strengthening an impression of "chameleonism" and lack of sincere direction. "Big Betty" is also non-original, a treatment of Huddie Ledbetter's song "Black Betty" in a manner reminiscent of The Spencer Davis Group's hits, providing the only real point of contact with the band's rhythm and blues past. Yet this still leaves a core of worthwhile, intelligent and melodic songs, also by Hugg and d'Abo apart from "Cubist Town", written by guitarist Tom McGuinness in a one-off collaboration. The group made full use of the new possibilities of multi-tracking, overlaying complex and inventive textures of flutes, keyboards and vibraphones, while the group's backing vocals, originally limited to a tribal unison, began to take on an almost Pet Sounds complexity, even if they're not quite as in tune.

Track listing
Recording dates taken from Greg Russo's book Mannerisms: The Five Phases Of Manfred Mann.

Original UK release

North American release

Personnel

Musicians
 Manfred Mann – keyboards, backing vocals
 Tom McGuinness – guitar, backing vocals
 Mike d'Abo – lead vocals
 Mike Hugg – drums and percussion
 Klaus Voormann – bass, woodwind, backing vocals
  Colin Richardson - acoustic bass on "Happy Families" - The Eddie Garvey Trio.
 Derek Wadsworth – trombone on "Each and Every Day"

Technical
 Manfred Mann – producer
 Keith Altham – liner notes

References

External links

1968 albums
Manfred Mann albums
Fontana Records albums